Poxviridae is a family of double-stranded DNA viruses. Vertebrates and arthropods serve as natural hosts. There are currently 83 species in this family, divided among 22 genera, which are divided into two subfamilies. Diseases associated with this family include smallpox.

Four genera of poxviruses may infect humans: Orthopoxvirus, Parapoxvirus, Yatapoxvirus, Molluscipoxvirus. Orthopoxvirus:  smallpox virus (variola), vaccinia virus, cowpox virus, monkeypox virus; Parapoxvirus: orf virus, pseudocowpox, bovine papular stomatitis virus; Yatapoxvirus:  tanapox virus, yaba monkey tumor virus; Molluscipoxvirus:  molluscum contagiosum virus (MCV). The most common are vaccinia (seen on the Indian subcontinent) and molluscum contagiosum, but monkeypox infections are rising (seen in west and central African rainforest countries). The similarly named disease chickenpox is not a true poxvirus and is caused by the herpesvirus varicella zoster.

Etymology 
The name of the family, Poxviridae, is a legacy of the original grouping of viruses associated with diseases that produced poxes in the skin. Modern viral classification is based on phenotypic characteristics; morphology, nucleic acid type, mode of replication, host organisms, and the type of disease they cause. The smallpox virus remains the most notable member of the family.

History

Diseases caused by pox viruses, especially smallpox, have been known about for centuries.  One of the earliest suspected cases is that of Egyptian pharaoh Ramses V who is thought to have died from smallpox circa 1150 years BCE.  Smallpox was thought to have been transferred to Europe around the early 8th century and then to the Americas in the early 16th century, resulting in the deaths of 3.2 million Aztecs within two years of introduction. This death toll can be attributed to the indigenous population's complete lack of exposure to the virus over millennia.

A century after Edward Jenner showed that the less potent cowpox could be used to effectively vaccinate against the more deadly smallpox, a worldwide effort to vaccinate everyone against smallpox began with the ultimate goal to rid the world of the plague-like epidemic.  The last case of endemic smallpox occurred in Somalia in 1977. Extensive searches over two years detected no further cases, and in 1979 the World Health Organization (WHO) declared the disease officially eradicated.

In 1986, all virus samples were destroyed or transferred to two approved WHO reference labs: at the headquarters of the federal Centers for Disease Control and Prevention (the C.D.C.) in Atlanta, Georgia (the United States) and at the Institute of Virus Preparations in Moscow. After September 11, 2001 the American and UK governments have had increased concern over the use of smallpox, or a smallpox-like disease, in bioterrorism. However, several poxviruses including vaccinia virus, myxoma virus, tanapox virus and raccoon pox virus are currently being investigated for their therapeutic potential in various human cancers in preclinical and clinical studies.

Microbiology

Structure 

Poxviridae viral particles (virions) are generally enveloped (external enveloped virion), though the intracellular mature virion form of the virus, which contains different envelope, is also infectious.  They vary in their shape depending upon the species but are generally shaped like a brick or as an oval form similar to a rounded brick because they are wrapped by the endoplasmic reticulum.  The virion is exceptionally large, its size is around 200 nm in diameter and 300 nm in length and carries its genome in a single, linear, double-stranded segment of DNA.  By comparison, rhinoviruses are 1/10 as large as a typical Poxviridae virion.

Genome
Phylogenetic analysis of 26 different chordopoxvirus genomes has shown that the central region of the genome is conserved and contains ~90 genes. The termini in contrast are not conserved between species. Of this group Avipoxvirus is the most divergent. The next most divergent is Molluscipoxvirus. Capripoxvirus, Leporipoxvirus, Suipoxvirus and Yatapoxvirus genera cluster together: Capripoxvirus and Suipoxvirus share a common ancestor and are distinct from the genus Orthopoxvirus. Within the Othopoxvirus genus Cowpox virus strain Brighton Red, Ectromelia virus and Monkeypox virus do not group closely with any other member. Variola virus and Camelpox virus form a subgroup. Vaccinia virus is most closely related to CPV-GRI-90.

The GC-content of family member genomes differ considerably. Avipoxvirus, capripoxvirus, cervidpoxvirus, orthopoxvirus, suipoxvirus, yatapoxvirus and one Entomopox genus (Betaentomopoxvirus) along with several other unclassified Entomopoxviruses have a low G+C content while others - Molluscipoxvirus, Orthopoxvirus, Parapoxvirus and some unclassified Chordopoxvirus - have a relatively high G+C content. The reasons for these differences are not known.

Replication

Replication of the poxvirus involves several stages. The virus first binds to a receptor on the host cell surface; the receptors for the poxvirus are thought to be glycosaminoglycans. After binding to the receptor, the virus enters the cell where it uncoats. Uncoating of the virus is a two step process. Firstly the outer membrane is removed as the particle enters the cell; secondly the virus particle (without the outer membrane) fuses with the cellular membrane to release the core into the cytoplasm. The pox viral genes are expressed in two phases. The early genes encode the non-structural protein, including proteins necessary for replication of the viral genome, and are expressed before the genome is replicated. The late genes are expressed after the genome has been replicated and encode the structural proteins to make the virus particle. The assembly of the virus particle occurs in five stages of maturation that lead to the final exocytosis of the new enveloped virion.  After the genome has been replicated, the immature virion assembles the A5 protein to create the intracellular mature virion.  The protein aligns and the brick-shaped envelope of the intracellular enveloped virion.  These particles are then fused to the cell plasma to form the cell-associated enveloped virion, which encounters the microtubules and prepares to exit the cell as an extracellular enveloped virion.  The assembly of the virus particle occurs in the cytoplasm of the cell and is a complex process that is currently being researched to understand each stage in more depth. Considering the fact that this virus is large and complex, replication is relatively quick taking approximately 12 hours until the host cell dies by the release of viruses.

The replication of poxvirus is unusual for a virus with double-stranded DNA genome because it occurs in the cytoplasm, although this is typical of other large DNA viruses. Poxvirus encodes its own machinery for genome transcription, a DNA dependent RNA polymerase, which makes replication in the cytoplasm possible.  Most double-stranded DNA viruses require the host cell's DNA-dependent RNA polymerase to perform transcription. These host polymerases are found in the nucleus, and therefore most double-stranded DNA viruses carry out a part of their infection cycle within the host cell's nucleus.

Evolution

The ancestor of the poxviruses is not known but structural studies suggest it may have been an adenovirus or a species related to both the poxviruses and the adenoviruses.

Based on the genome organisation and DNA replication mechanism a phylogenetic relationships may exist between the rudiviruses (Rudiviridae) and the large eukaryal DNA viruses: the African swine fever virus (Asfarviridae), Chlorella viruses (Phycodnaviridae) and poxviruses (Poxviridae).

The mutation rate in poxvirus genomes has been estimated to be 0.9–1.2 x 10−6 substitutions per site per year. A second estimate puts this rate at 0.5–7 × 10−6 nucleotide substitutions per site per year. A third estimate places the rate at  4–6 × 10−6.

The last common ancestor of the extant poxviruses that infect vertebrates existed . The genus Avipoxvirus diverged from the ancestor 249 ± 69 thousand years ago. A second estimate of this divergence time places this event at 166,000 ± 43,000 years ago. The division of the Orthopoxvirus into the extant genera occurred ~14,000 years ago. The genus Leporipoxvirus diverged ~137,000 ± 35,000 years ago. This was followed by the ancestor of the genus Yatapoxvirus. The last common ancestor of the Capripoxvirus and Suipoxvirus diverged 111,000 ± 29,000 years ago.

An isolate from a fish – salmon gill poxvirus – appears to be the earliest branch in the Chordopoxvirinae. A new systematic has been proposed recently after findings of a new squirrel poxvirus in Berlin, Germany.

Smallpox
The date of the appearance of smallpox is not settled. It most likely evolved from a rodent virus between 68,000 and 16,000 years ago. The wide range of dates is due to the different records used to calibrate the molecular clock. One clade was the variola major strains (the more clinically severe form of smallpox) which spread from Asia between 400 and 1,600 years ago. A second clade included both alastrim minor (a phenotypically mild smallpox) described from the American continents and isolates from West Africa which diverged from an ancestral strain between 1,400 and 6,300 years before present. This clade further diverged into two subclades at least 800 years ago.

A second estimate has placed the separation of variola from Taterapox at 3000–4000 years ago. This is consistent with archaeological and historical evidence regarding the appearance of smallpox as a human disease which suggests a relatively recent origin. However, if the mutation rate is assumed to be similar to that of the herpesviruses the divergence date between variola from Taterapox has been estimated to be 50,000 years ago. While this is consistent with the other published estimates it suggests that the archaeological and historical evidence is very incomplete. Better estimates of mutation rates in these viruses are needed.

Taxonomy

The species in the subfamily Chordopoxvirinae infect vertebrates and those in the subfamily Entomopoxvirinae infect insects. There are ten recognised genera in the Chordopoxvirinae and three in the Entomopoxvirinae.

The following subfamilies and genera are recognized (-virinae denotes subfamily and -virus denotes genus):

Chordopoxvirinae
 Avipoxvirus
 Capripoxvirus
 Centapoxvirus
 Cervidpoxvirus
 Crocodylidpoxvirus
 Leporipoxvirus
 Macropopoxvirus
 Molluscipoxvirus
 Mustelpoxvirus
 Orthopoxvirus
 Oryzopoxvirus
 Parapoxvirus
 Pteropopoxvirus
 Salmonpoxvirus
 Sciuripoxvirus
 Suipoxvirus
 Vespertilionpoxvirus
 Yatapoxvirus

Entomopoxvirinae
 Alphaentomopoxvirus
 Betaentomopoxvirus
 Deltaentomopoxvirus
 Diachasmimorpha entomopoxvirus
 Gammaentomopoxvirus

Both subfamilies also contain a number of unclassified species for which new genera may be created in the future.
 Cotia virus of 2012 is an unusual chordopoxvirus that may belong to a new genus. Cotia virus was assigned the new genus Oryzopoxvirus in 2019. A Brazilian porcupinepox virus discovered in 2019 is closely related to the virus.
 Two more chordopoxviruses are NY_014 and murmansk poxvirus. They are considered closely related to a "Yoka poxvirus". ICTV classifies them under a genus Centapoxvirus, created 2016.

Vaccinia virus

The prototypical poxvirus is vaccinia virus, known for its role in the eradication of smallpox. The vaccinia virus is an effective tool for foreign protein expression, as it elicits a strong host immune-response. The vaccinia virus enters cells primarily by cell fusion, although currently the receptor responsible is unknown.

Vaccinia contains three classes of genes: early, intermediate and late. These genes are transcribed by viral RNA polymerase and associated transcription factors. Vaccinia replicates its genome in the cytoplasm of infected cells, and after late-stage gene expression undergoes virion morphogenesis, which produces intracellular mature virions contained within an envelope membrane. The origin of the envelope membrane is still unknown. The intracellular mature virions are then transported to the Golgi apparatus where it is wrapped with an additional two membranes, becoming the intracellular enveloped virus. This is transported along cytoskeletal microtubules to reach the cell periphery, where it fuses with the plasma membrane to become the cell-associated enveloped virus. This triggers actin tails on cell surfaces or is released as external enveloped virion.

See also
 Quokkapox virus
 Water warts

References

External links
 Electron micrographs of Orthopoxvirus and Parapoxvirus Genera, including the smallpox virus, have been collected by the International Committee on Taxonomy of Viruses in their Poxviridae picture gallery.
 
 NCBI Taxonomy Page.
 Poxviridae at the Viral Bioinformatics Resource Center.
 Viralzone: Poxviridae
 ICTV
 Virus Pathogen Database and Analysis Resource (ViPR): Poxviridae

 
Virus families